Central United Methodist Church may refer to:

in the Philippines
 Central United Methodist Church (Manila)

in the United States
 Central United Methodist Church (Detroit), listed on the NRHP in Michigan
 Central United Methodist Church (Mansfield, Ohio), listed on the NRHP in Ohio
 Central Methodist Church (Spartanburg, South Carolina)
 Central United Methodist Church (Knoxville, Tennessee), listed on the NRHP in Tennessee